Ken Cunningham is the name of:

K. G. Cunningham (born 1939), South Australian radio presenter and cricketer
Ken Cunningham (basketball) (1943–2015), college basketball coach
Kenny Cunningham (born 1971), Irish former footballer
Ken Cunningham (diplomat), New Zealand ambassador to Chile, Saudi Arabia and others
Ken Cunningham (politician), treasurer of the Constitution Party of Oregon